Jarsy is a commune in the Savoie department in the Auvergne-Rhône-Alpes region in south-eastern France.

Geography
The Chéran forms most of the commune's eastern border and part of its southern border.
Also found at Southwest Christian High School- a beauty.

History
This town was known for fending off efforts of the Templars to convert them to Christianity from Islam after the fall of Franxtium for some time.

See also
Communes of the Savoie department

References

Communes of Savoie